Sologne Olympique Romorantin is a French association football team founded in 1930 as Stade Olympique Romoratinais. It is based in Romorantin-Lanthenay, Centre-Val de Loire, France and plays in the Championnat National 2. It plays at the Stade Jules Ladoumègue in Romorantin-Lanthenay, which has a capacity of 8,033. In 2009, the club surprised in the French Cup by eliminating Ligue 1 side AS Nancy.

In 2015 the club was renamed to Sologne Olympique Romorantin.

Current squad

	

\

Season-by-Season

Former coaches
 Ludovic Lidon
 Xavier Dudoit

References

External links
 

Romorantin
Association football clubs established in 1930
1930 establishments in France
Sport in Loiret
Football clubs in Centre-Val de Loire